Dražen Bošnjaković (born 6 January 1961) is a Croatian politician who had served as the Minister of Justice in the cabinet of Andrej Plenković from 2017 to 2020.

Early life and education
Bošnjaković was born in Vukovar in 1961. He lived in Ilok until he was eighteen. He was a good student, and after finishing high school he went to Zagreb and studied at the Law faculty.

Career
On beginning his career Bošnjaković worked in the Council of Ivanić Grad, and from 1993 until 1997 he was a secretary in Sisak-Moslavina County. After that he started his own law firm and worked as a lawyer until entering into politics. He became a member of the Croatian Parliament on December 23, 2003, and served until January 11, 2008. From 2008, he was a state secretary in the Ministry of Justice of Republic of Croatia, and he is a member of the Central Committee of Croatian Democratic Union (HDZ). He is vice-president of the County Committee of HDZ of Zagreb County for then years.

Other activities
 Academy of European Law (ERA), Member of the Governing Board

Personal life
He is married and he is father of three children. He speaks English, and his hobbies are biking, skiing, and tennis.

References

Croatian Sabor - Dražen Bošnjaković
Bošnjaković - Odlikaš iz Vukovara specijalist je za kompromise (Večernji list) 
Bošnjaković je upućen u sve započete reforme (Jutarnji list) 

1961 births
Living people
People from Vukovar
Croatian Democratic Union politicians
Representatives in the modern Croatian Parliament
Faculty of Law, University of Zagreb alumni
Academic staff of the University of Zagreb
Justice ministers of Croatia